Johannes Nolten (27 October 1888 – 25 February 1944) was a Dutch wrestler. He competed in the Greco-Roman lightweight event at the 1920 Summer Olympics.

References

External links
 

1888 births
1944 deaths
Olympic wrestlers of the Netherlands
Wrestlers at the 1920 Summer Olympics
Dutch male sport wrestlers
People from Etten-Leur
Sportspeople from North Brabant